Richard Parsons may refer to:

 Richard Parsons (diplomat) (1928–2016), British ambassador to Hungary, Spain and Sweden
 Richard Parsons (businessman) (born 1948), former chairman of Citigroup and the former Chairman and CEO of Time Warner
 Richard Parsons (author) (born 1966), English educational non-fiction author
 Richard Parsons, 1st Earl of Rosse (1702–1741), freemason and founder member of the Hell-Fire Club
 Richard Parsons (convict) (fl. 1823), Australian explorer
 Richard Parsons (skier) (1910-1999), American Olympic skier
 Richard C. Parsons (1826–1899), U.S. Representative from Ohio
 Richard Parsons (bishop) (1882–1948), English Anglican bishop
 Richard Martyn Parsons (1910–1998), British Army championship rifle marksman
 Dick Parsons (coach) (born 1938), retired American basketball and baseball coach